Proteus is an animated documentary film written and directed by David Lebrun in 2004. It depicts a 19th-century understanding of the sea by interweaving the life and work of German biologist and researcher Ernst Haeckel with excerpts from Samuel Taylor Coleridge's epic poem The Rime of the Ancient Mariner, and the story of the oceanographic Challenger expedition of the 1870s.

One-celled microorganisms known as radiolarians feature prominently in Haeckel's fascination with the observable natural world and the underlying guiding principles assumed to be implicit in its very existence.

References

External links 
 

2004 films
English-language Canadian films
Canadian animated documentary films
Maritime culture
Documentary films about the history of science
2004 documentary films
2000s English-language films
2000s Canadian films